In mathematics, an affine representation of a topological Lie group G on an affine space A is a continuous (smooth) group homomorphism from G to the automorphism group of A, the affine group Aff(A). Similarly, an affine representation of a Lie algebra g on A is a Lie algebra homomorphism from g to the Lie algebra aff(A) of the affine group of A.

An example is the action of the Euclidean group E(n) on the Euclidean space En.

Since the affine group in dimension n is a matrix group in dimension n + 1, an affine representation may be thought of as a particular kind of linear representation. We may ask whether a given affine representation has a fixed point in the given affine space A. If it does, we may take that as origin and regard A as a vector space; in that case, we actually have a linear representation in dimension n. This reduction depends on a group cohomology question, in general.

See also
 Group action
 Projective representation

References

 .

Homological algebra
Representation theory of Lie algebras
Representation theory of Lie groups